Geastrum berkeleyi, or Berkeley's earthstar, is an inedible species of mushroom belonging to the genus Geastrum, or earthstar fungi. Despite being a very uncommon mushroom, it has a wide geographical distribution, having been documented in Northern and Eastern Europe, such as Austria, the Czech Republic, Denmark, Estonia, Finland, Great Britain, Hungary, the Netherlands, Poland, Slovakia, Spain, Sweden and Turkey, and parts of Eastern Asia, such as China and Japan. The species was thought extinct in Poland until it was discovered growing in a reserve near Chęciny. G. berkeleyi can be distinguished from other species of Geastrum by the flat bipyramidal shape of the calcium oxalate crystals found on its endoperidium.

References

External links
Index Fungorum

berkeleyi
Fungi of Europe
Inedible fungi
Fungi described in 1889